Sadian-e Maraq (also Romanized as Sādīān-e Maraq; also known as Bīdīān, Sādīān, and Sādīyān) is a village in Babaafzal Rural District, Barzok District, Kashan County, Isfahan Province, Iran. At the 2006 census, its population was 450, in 123 families.

References 

Populated places in Kashan County